War on the Plains, also called Across the Plains, is a 1912 American silent short Western film directed by Thomas H. Ince and starring Francis Ford, Ethel Grandin and Ray Myers. It was produced by Bison Motion Pictures, a subsidiary of the New York Motion Picture Company. The film was made at Inceville, Santa Ynez, California.

This short is referred to as Across the Plains in Daniel Blum's Pictorial History of Silent Films. Several other films with this title were released before and after this short was initially distributed.

Cast
 Francis Ford as Drake, a Treacherous Prospector
 Ethel Grandin as Ethel, the Wagon Captain's Daughter
 Ray Myers as A Young Emigrant
 Howard Davies as A Prospector
 William Eagle Shirt as Indian
 J. Barney Sherry as Frontiersman
 Art Acord as Frontiersman
 Clayton Monroe Teters as Indian (unbilled)

Preservation status
This film is preserved in the UCLA Film & TV archive.

References

External links
 

1912 films
1912 Western (genre) films
American black-and-white films
American silent short films
Films directed by Thomas H. Ince
Silent American Western (genre) films
1910s American films